William F. Leonard (August 9, 1913 – August 4, 1985) was a U.S. Army veteran of World War II and a recipient of the Medal of Honor.

Born in Lockport, New York, Leonard would enter the United States Army from Buffalo NY, on November 17, 1942.

President Barack Obama posthumously awarded him the Medal of Honor in a March 18, 2014, ceremony in the White House. The award resulted from a Defense Authorization Act which directed a review of all Jewish American and Hispanic American veterans from World War II, the Korean War and the Vietnam War who had been awarded lower-precedence valor awards to ensure that no prejudice was shown to those deserving the Medal of Honor.  In Leonard's case, he had originally been awarded the Distinguished Service Cross, the United States' second-highest decoration for combat valor.

Medal of Honor Citation
Private First Class Leonard's official Medal of Honor citation reads:

Private First Class William F. Leonard distinguished himself by acts of gallantry and intrepidity above and beyond the call of duty while serving as a Squad Leader in Company C, 30th Infantry Regiment, 3d Infantry Division during combat operations against an armed enemy near St. Die, France on November 7, 1944. Private First Class Leonard's platoon was reduced to eight men as a result of blistering artillery, mortar, machinegun, and rifle fire. Private First Class Leonard led the survivors in an assault over a hill covered by trees and shrubs which the enemy continuously swept with automatic weapons fire. Ignoring bullets which pierced his pack, Private First Class Leonard killed two snipers at ranges of fifty and seventy-five yards and engaged and destroyed a machinegun nest with grenades, killing its two-man crew. Though momentarily stunned by an exploding bazooka shell, Private First Class Leonard relentlessly advanced, ultimately knocking out a second machinegun nest and capturing the roadblock objective. Private First Class Leonard's extraordinary heroism and selflessness above and beyond the call of duty are in keeping with the highest traditions of military service and reflect great credit upon himself, his unit and the United States Army.

Military Awards 
Leonard's military decorations and awards include:

See also
List of Medal of Honor recipients for World War II

References

1913 births
1985 deaths
United States Army personnel of World War II
People from Lockport, New York
United States Army Medal of Honor recipients
United States Army soldiers
World War II recipients of the Medal of Honor